Minaret is a tower-like component of a mosque.

Minaret or minar may also refer to:
Minaret of Jam, Afghanistan
Minaret College, an Islamic, independent school in Australia
Minaret Summit, a mountain pass in Australia
Minar (Firuzabad), a tower-like structure at the center of Firuzabad, Iran
Minaq or Minar, a village in Iran
Minaret of Israel
Minar-e-Pakistan
Minarets (California), a mountain formation in the United States
The Minarets (New Zealand), two mountains in New Zealand
Minaret (novel), a 2005 novel by Leila Aboulela
Minaret (band), an Azerbaijani rock band
Project MINARET, a National Security Agency surveillance operation
Minar Rahman or Minar (born 1992), Bangladeshi lyricist, composer, singer, actor and cartoonist
 Menorahs and Minarets, a 2017 book by Kamal Ruhayyim

See also
Menar (disambiguation)
Menareh Bazar or Minar-Bazar, a village in Iran
Minarets (disambiguation)